Christian Gasc (8 August 1945 – 11 January 2022) was a French costumer for film, theatre, and opera.

Biography
Gasc was born in Dunes to a mechanic father and wife a seamstress mother. He discovered cinema in Valence at the age of eight and moved to Paris at nineteen. There, he met Liliane de Kermadec who proposed that he create costumes for her film, Aloïse. He won three consecutive César Awards for the films Madame Butterfly, Ridicule, and On Guard.

Gasc was found dead in his Parisian apartment on 10 January 2022 at the age of 76.

Filmography

Cinema

Aloïse (1975)
French Provincial (1975)
Lumière (1976)
Surreal Estate (1976)
Barocco (1976)
 (1977)
Les Rendez-vous d'Anna (1977)
The Green Room (1978)
 (1979)
Return to the Beloved (1979)
The Brontë Sisters (1979)
Courage fuyons (1979)
Loulou (1980)
The Wings of the Dove (1981)
Hotel America (1981)
 (1982)
Passion (1982)
Cap Canaille (1983)
The Children (1984)
Rendez-vous (1985)
Scene of the Crime (1986)
 (1986)
Les Innocents (1987)
Chocolat (1988)
Walking a Tightrope (1991)
Madame Butterfly (1995)
Ridicule (1996)
My Man (1996)
On Guard (1997)
Augustin, King of Kung-Fu (1999)
The Widow of Saint-Pierre (2000)
Sade (2000)
Tosca (2001)
Strayed (2003)
Les Côtelettes (2003)
Changing Times (2004)
The Black Box (2005)
The Women on the 6th Floor (2010)
Farewell, My Queen (2012)
Madame Bovary (2014)
Being 17 (2016)

Television
The Counterfeiters (2010)

References

1945 births
2022 deaths
French costume designers
French scenic designers
César Award winners
People from Tarn-et-Garonne
Chevaliers of the Légion d'honneur